"The blind leading the blind" is an idiom and a metaphor in the form of a parallel phrase, it is used to describe a situation where a person who knows nothing is getting advice and help from another person who knows almost nothing.

History 
The idiom can be traced back to the Upanishads, which were written around 800 BCE

A similar metaphor exists in the Buddhist Pali Canon, composed in North India, and preserved orally until it was committed to writing during the Fourth Buddhist Council in Sri Lanka in 29 BCE.

The similar expression appears in Horace (Epistles, book I, epistle XVII, line 4):  ("the blind wishing to show the way"). Horace was the leading Roman lyric poet during the time of Augustus (27 BCE – 14 CE)

Probably the first time where the saying appears in its exact form was in the New Testament. It is mentioned several times in the gospels, with similar stories appearing in Matthew, Luke and Thomas, possibly via the Q source.

Sextus Empiricus (160 – 210CE) compares ignorant teachers and blind guides in Outlines of Scepticism:

The phrase appears in Adagia, an annotated collection of Greek and Latin proverbs, compiled during the Renaissance by Dutch humanist Desiderius Erasmus Roterodamus. The first edition, titled Collectanea Adagiorum, was published in Paris in 1500 CE.

Augustine of Hippo, a catholic theologian, writes ″Vae caecis ducentibus! Vae caecis sequentibus!″, Latin for "woe to the blind that lead, woe to the blind that follow".

Artistic depictions 

Perhaps the most famous artistic depiction of the phrase is Pieter Bruegel's The Blind Leading the Blind. The distemper on canvas painting was completed in 1568, and is currently in the collection of the Museo di Capodimonte in Naples, Italy.

References in popular culture 
"The Blind Leading the Blind" is a poem by Pulitzer Prize winning poet Lisel Mueller.

"Blind Leading the Blind" is a song by Lynsey de Paul. It was the 'B' side of her 1973 single, "All Night".

"Blind leading the blind" was a song written by Mick Jagger, performed by Mick Jagger and Dave Stewart for the soundtrack of the 2004 film Alfie.

In a notable episode of Sex and the City Samantha tells Carrie that giving her advice is like "the blind leading the blind".

The song "Ego Tripp" by Mushroomhead includes the lyrics, "as the blind lead the blind on a crusade for sight".

The song "Disconnected" by Keane includes the lyrics, "We walk in circles, the blind leading the blind".

"Blind Leading the Blind" is a song by Mumford & Sons. It was released on October 23, 2019.

The 1947 play A Streetcar Named Desire by Tennessee Williams includes the phrase "The blind are leading the blind".

The song "Manunkind" by Metallica has the phrase "blind lead blind" in the "quest to find faith in manunkind".

The song "Estallando desde el océano" by Argentinian band Sumo includes the lyrics
"Firefly cars, women rushing past
The road was long and the race was fast
Gradually I fell behind
It was the blind leading the blind".

"The Blind Leading the Blind" is an album recorded in 2018 by a Ukrainian black metal band 1914.

"The Blind Leading the Naked" is an album recorded in 1986 by Violent Femmes.

"The Blind Leading The Blind" is a song recorded by American Grunge band Skin Yard for their 1987 Self-Titled debut album.

References

External links

Idioms
Blindness
Philosophical analogies